Galgisan is a mountain located in Yangpyeong County, Gyeonggi Province, and Hongcheon County, Gangwon Province, South Korea.

See also
Geography of Korea
List of mountains in Korea
List of mountains by elevation
Mountain portal
South Korea portal

References

Mountains of Gyeonggi Province
Mountains of Gangwon Province, South Korea
Yangpyeong County
Hongcheon County
Mountains of South Korea
Mountains of North Chungcheong Province